A cell dog is a rescue dog that is being housed with a prison inmate, with the goal of improving the lives of both. Through intensive training, prison inmates are able to transform a homeless, abused, or neglected dog into a service animal. The founder of the cell dog program was a Dominican nun named Sister Pauline Quinn. Starting in Washington state in the 1990s, the program soon took off, spreading to over two hundred prisons across the United States. Quinn's idea has spread internationally helping inmates and at risk dogs around the world.

Method
The participating prisons and local animal shelters decide which dogs are fit for the cell dog program. Once housed, each dog is paired with an inmate. The goal for the inmates is to transform their dog into a service animal through weeks of obedience training. Additionally, through the process of training both the Cell dog and inmate gain companionship and socialization exposure. Given their prior circumstances, they might not have experienced such exposure otherwise. Throughout the training, inmates receive animal-assisted therapy as well as human–canine bonding.

The inmates train therapy and service dogs as a way to give back to society. Military veterans, individuals with autism, and those who are physically disabled are just a few who benefit from the hard work the inmates put into the Cell dogs. The inmates feel a strong sense of service and accomplishment when the dogs graduate from their training.

The benefits of Cell dogs includes much more than just the rehabilitation of both the dogs and the inmates. Signs of improved mental health among the inmates is a common outcome post training and caring for the Cell dogs. Inmates often see the responsibility to care and train the dogs as a "second chance." Given the responsibility and role the inmates must play in the dogs lives, the overall aggression among inmates goes down as well.

Many of the Cell dogs are homeless prior to their training. These dogs are commonly labeled "at risk," due to their likelihood of being euthanized or their past history of fighting. Like the inmates, the Cell dogs also receive a second chance at life. Once enrolled in the Cell dog program they receive shelter, food, and a primary caretaker. Cell dogs often go on to help those in need after finishing their training in the form of a service dog.

Sister Pauline Quinn 
Sister Pauline Quinn struggled in her early life living in abusive and unhealthy homes. When she was young, Quinn lived in over a dozen facilities. Due to her past, Quinn was paralyzed by fear and insecurities. Needing a sign, she turned her care over to God. Her cries for help were answered when a German Shepherd named Joni entered Quinn's life. Joni gave her life meaning. Training Joni, she found what she was most passionate about. Quinn realized there were people in need who were desperate for the care and support of service dogs, as well as a demand for someone to train them.

Upon starting the first Cell dog program in 1981, Sister Pauline Quinn's dream has spread around the world. Institutions across North America, parts of Europe, and even Hong Kong have been a part of Cell dog programs. Sister Pauline Quinn continues her work today by giving motivational talks sharing her story to inspire others.

Training 
During the training process, the cell dog and the inmate are inseparable. Exercising, training, and sleeping are a part of the daily routine between the two. By spending all of their time together, a bond is solidified between the two. This helps in the training process because of the developed trust and established relationship. The inmates are given assistance by trained professionals on how to properly instruct the Cell dogs. The goal of the Cell dog program is to take an untrained puppy, and transform them into a service dog. Weekly training sessions led by professional therapy, emotional support, and guide dog trainers, provides the inmates with the skills needed to teach the dogs the necessary skills it takes to assist someone in need.  During the training process, inmates express they form special bonds with their Cell dog, and the thought of the dogs leaving their side once training is complete can be a challenging experience for many.

Life after incarceration 
While in prison, gaining skills to apply to the workforce can be difficult for those incarcerated. The purpose of the Cell dog program is to teach them valuable life skills they can apply to their lives after serving their sentence. Prison systems that utilize the Cell dog programs see a decrease in re-incarceration rates among those who participated in the programs. Inmates often feel a moral obligation to turn their lives around once they are freed because of the impact they've had on their Cell dog.

See also

References 

Dog roles
Imprisonment and detention
Canids and humans